The 2011 Maui Invitational Tournament was an early-season college basketball tournament played from November 11 to November 23, 2011.  It was the 28th annual holding of the Maui Invitational Tournament, which began in 1984, and was part of the 2011–12 NCAA Division I men's basketball season.  The Championship Round was played at the Lahaina Civic Center in Maui, Hawaii from November 21 to 23.  The Duke Blue Devils won the tournament title, defeating the Kansas Jayhawks in the championship game on November 23 by a score of 68–61.  Duke's Ryan Kelly was named the MVP of the tournament.  With the victory, Duke won the Maui Invitational Tournament for the fifth time in five appearances, improving the program's overall record at the Maui competition to 15–0.

Brackets 
* – Denotes overtime period

Opening Round
The Opening Round was played on November 11, 14 and 15 at various sites around the country.

November 11
Kansas 100, Towson 54 in Lawrence, KS
Tennessee 92, UNC Greensboro 63 in Knoxville, TN
Duke 77, Belmont 76 in Durham, NC

November 14
Michigan 64, Towson 47 in Ann Arbor, MI
Georgetown 86, UNC Greensboro 45 in Washington, DC

November 15
UCLA 66, Middle Tennessee 86 in Los Angeles, CA
Memphis 97, Belmont 81 in Memphis, TN

Regional Round

*Games played at Murphy Center in Murfreesboro, Tennessee

Championship Round
The Championship Round will occur from November 21–23 at Lahaina Civic Center in Maui, Hawaii.

References

Maui Invitational Tournament
Maui Invitational
Maui